Bailleau-l'Évêque is a commune in the Eure-et-Loir department in northern France.

Population

Sights
Bois de Bailleau-l'Évêque (fauna and flora), the Château de Levesville (end of 15th century), the Château de Bailleau (a 12th-century church), several traditional farms in the Beauce region, and the remains of the Louis XIV canal, still in water and preserved.

See also
Communes of the Eure-et-Loir department

References

External links

 L'Internaute: Bailleau-L'Eveque Statistics in French

Communes of Eure-et-Loir